The 1840 New York gubernatorial election was held from November 2 to 4, 1840, to elect the Governor and Lieutenant Governor of New York.

Candidates
The Whig Party nominated incumbent governor William H. Seward. They nominated incumbent Luther Bradish for Lieutenant Governor.

The Democratic Party nominated former Erie Canal Commissioner William C. Bouck. They nominated state senator Daniel S. Dickinson for Lieutenant Governor.

The Liberty party nominated Gerrit Smith. They nominated Charles O. Shepard for Lieutenant Governor.

Results
The Whig ticket of Seward and Bradish was elected.

Sources
Result: The Tribune Almanac 1842

1840
New York
Gubernatorial election
November 1840 events